The International Conference on Neutrino Physics and Astrophysics is a significant international conference series in the field of neutrino physics, during which talks detailing notable progress in theoretical and experimental work are given.  In addition, the conference reviews the status of proposed research in neutrino physics and astrophysics. Held every two years, the conference programs consist of plenary sessions with invited speakers, poster sessions and short evening talks.  The shorthand designator for a particular conference is "Neutrino" followed by its year, e.g. Neutrino 2011.

The first conference was held in Balatonfüred in 1972; however, three preceding conferences are often referenced with respect to the history of the Neutrino series. These meetings include the 1965 Informal Conference on Experimental Neutrino Physics at CERN; a 1968 conference in Moscow sponsored by the Academy of the USSR, which was organized just after certain cosmic ray neutrino events were seen in the gold mines of India, South Africa and Utah; and a 1970 meeting in Cortona.

Each conference is supervised by a changing International Advisory Committee as well as the permanent International Neutrino Commission. The latter is assembled from the chairs of former conferences.

The 28th meeting, Neutrino 2018, concluded June 9, 2018 in Heidelberg after featuring presentations encompassing many different branches of neutrino physics. It was recently announced that Neutrino 2024 will be held in Milano, following the 2020 conference in Chicago and the 2022 conference in Seoul.

References

Physics conferences